The Laurence Olivier Award for Best Actor in a Musical is an annual award presented by the Society of London Theatre in recognition of achievements in commercial London theatre. The awards were established as the Society of West End Theatre Awards in 1976, and renamed in 1984 in honour of English actor and director Laurence Olivier.

This award was introduced in 1979, along with the award for Best Actress in a Musical. In 1977 and 1978, there had been a commingled actor/actress award for Best Performance in a Musical, won both times by an actress.

Winners and nominees

1970s

1980s

1990s

2000s

2010s

2020s

Multiple awards and nominations for Best Actor

Awards

Three awards
Philip Quast

Two awards
Michael Ball
Michael Crawford
Robert Lindsay
Daniel Evans

Nominations

Four nominations
Philip Quast

Three nominations
Alun Armstrong
Michael Crawford
Daniel Evans
Tim Flavin
Henry Goodman
Douglas Hodge
Denis Lawson
Robert Lindsay
Clark Peters
Jonathan Pryce

Two nominations
Michael Ball
Ian Bartholomow
Bertie Carvel
Tim Curry
Killian Donnelly
Paul Keating
Mark McGann
Charlie Stemp

Multiple awards and nominations for a character

Awards

3 awards
Sweeney Todd from Sweeney Todd: The Demon Barber of Fleet Street

2 awards
George from Sunday in the Park with George

Nominations

4 nominations
Sweeney Todd from Sweeney Todd: The Demon Barber of Fleet Street

3 nominations
Billy Flynn from Chicago
Fagin from Oliver!
Fred Graham from Kiss Me, Kate
Henry Higgins from My Fair Lady
Nathan Detroit from Guys and Dolls
Emcee in Cabaret

2 nominations
Albin from La Cage aux Folles
Curly from Oklahoma!
Emile de Becque from South Pacific
George from Sunday in the Park with George
Haywood Patterson from The Scottsboro Boys
Mickey from Blood Brothers
Sky Masterson from Guys and Dolls
The Engineer from Miss Saigon
The Pirate King from The Pirates of Penzance

See also
 Tony Award for Best Actor in a Leading Role in a Musical
Drama Desk Award for Outstanding Actor in a Leading Role in a Musical

References

External links
 

Actor
Theatre acting awards